The Northwest African Troop Carrier Command (NATCC) was a combined British-U.S. air command of the Second World War. 

It was a sub-command of the Northwest African Air Forces which itself was a sub-command of the Mediterranean Air Command (MAC). These new Allied air force organizations were created at the Casablanca Conference in January 1943 to promote cooperation between the British Royal Air Force (RAF), the American United States Army Air Forces, and their respective ground and naval forces in the North African and Mediterranean Theater of Operations (MTO) during the Second World War. Effective from February 18, 1943, the NATCC and other MAC commands existed until December 10, 1943 when MAC was disbanded and the Mediterranean Allied Air Forces (MAAF) were established. Brigadier General Paul Williams was the commander of NATCC.

The components of NATCC at the time of the Allied invasion of Sicily (codenamed "Operation Husky") on July 10, 1943 are illustrated below.

Northwest African Troop Carrier CommandBrigadier General Paul L. Williams

Note:
In mid-1943, to facilitate transport and supply operations for Operation Husky, the USAAF 315th Troop Carrier Group (34th & 43rd Squadrons) was sent from England to Tunisia and assigned to the Mediterranean Air Transport Service which along with NATCC, was a sub-command of the Mediterranean Air Command.

A tragedy occurred over the Farello Airstrip, when American anti-aircraft gunners mistook American troop carrier transports for enemy planes. On the night of July 11, 1943, 23 of 144 aircraft failed to return to Tunisia. Another 37 planes were badly damaged. The aircraft loss ratio was very high, at 16%. Brigadier General Charles Keerans, Jr., the Assistant Division Commander (ADC) of the U.S. 82nd Airborne Division, was aboard one of the planes that did not return. The 504th Parachute Regimental Combat Team (including the 1st and 2nd Battalions of the 504th PIR, along with the 376th Parachute Field Artillery Battalion, Company 'C' of the 307th Airborne Engineer Battalion and numerous medical and signal units attached, for a total of some 2,300 men), under Colonel Reuben Tucker, suffered a total of 229 casualties on the night of 11 July 1943: 81 dead, 132 wounded, and 16 missing.

Citations

References
Maurer, Maurer, Air Force Combat Units Of World War II, Office of Air Force History, Maxwell AFB, Alabama, 1983.
Participation of the Ninth & Twelfth Air Forces in the Sicilian Campaign, Army Air Forces Historical Study No. 37, Army Air Forces Historical Office Headquarters, Maxwell AFB, Alabama, 1945.

Allied air commands of World War II
Military units and formations of the Royal Air Force in World War II